Russell Hardy is a British businessman, and the chief executive (CEO) of Vitol, the world's largest independent oil trading company.

Early life
Hardy has a master's degree in engineering from Imperial College London.

Career
Hardy began his career working for BP, trading fuel oil.

In 1993, Hardy left BP and joined Vitol. He has been a member of its executive committee since 2007, and  CEO of the Europe, Middle-East and Africa region since 2017. In March 2018, he was appointed CEO of the entire company, succeeding Ian Taylor, who became chairman.

In 2022, Hardy predicted that Russia won't be able to protect itself from the negative effects of the Western sanctions, while Russian oil export would fall to 1 million barrels a day in winter 2022-2023.

References

Living people
British chief executives
Alumni of Imperial College London
Year of birth missing (living people)